Dale Allen Blaney (born January 30, 1964) is an American professional former race car driver, former professional basketball player, and is currently an assistant coach for the Westminster College basketball team.

Basketball career
Blaney was a basketball star for West Virginia University. He averaged 12.3 points a game. He also had several honors, including the Atlantic 10 all-rookie team, all-tournament team (twice), all-conference team, and player of the week on December 1, 1985. He was drafted by the Los Angeles Lakers in 1986, but quit before the 1986–87 season started so he could focus on racing as a career. In 1989 he played for the Youngstown Pride of the World Basketball League.

Racing career
Blaney is a six-time champion of the All Star Circuit of Champions and, as of July 2019, has recorded 137 career victories with the series. He also has 11 victories with the World of Outlaws, the top touring series in sprint car racing.

Personal life
Blaney was born in Hartford, Ohio on January 30, 1964. He is the brother of former WOO and NASCAR Sprint Cup Series driver Dave Blaney and uncle of Ryan Blaney. He has two daughters, Leah and Ashley.

References

External links
 

1964 births
Living people
Basketball players from Pennsylvania
Los Angeles Lakers draft picks
People from Sharon, Pennsylvania
Rapid City Thrillers players
West Virginia Mountaineers men's basketball players
World of Outlaws drivers
Racing drivers from Ohio
People from Trumbull County, Ohio